Cody Michael Burger (born August 4, 1983) is an American former child actor and network engineer whose noteworthy acting credentials include portraying Cousin Rocky Johnson in National Lampoon's Christmas Vacation (1989), an appearance on the hit television program Home Improvement (1991), Mel Gibson's vehicle Forever Young (1992), and most recently, several lines delivered alongside Ben Stiller in Disney's Heavyweights (1995).

Since then, Burger has been attending Florida State University and has made no announcements of a return to acting. He currently works as a senior network engineer and resides in Tallahassee, Florida.

Filmography

Notable television guest appearances
Home Improvement playing "Cub Scout #3" in episode: "Wild Kingdom" (episode # 1.5) 15 October 1991
Anything But Love in episode: "The Days of Whine and..." (episode # 2.21) 21 March 1990

References

External links

1983 births
Living people
American male child actors
American male film actors
American male television actors
Florida State University alumni
20th-century American male actors